Edward Eugene Williams (born September 8, 1961) is a former American football linebacker in the National Football League. He played for the New England Patriots. He played college football for the Texas Longhorns.

References

1961 births
Living people
American football linebackers
New England Patriots players
Texas Longhorns football players
People from Odessa, Texas
Players of American football from Texas